Shalev Menashe (born 23 May 1982) is a retired Israeli footballer who last played at Maccabi Netanya.

Career
Menashe started his senior career with Ironi Rishon Letzion a small club in the Israeli Premier League, but after two solid seasons in Rishon where he helped the team avoid relegation he made a move to Maccabi Petah Tikva. However, his time at Maccabi was unsuccessful when he only played one season.

In 2004, he signed a deal with Hapoel Kfar Saba from Liga Leumit and in his first season with them he won the league and after 3 years with Kfar Saba he moved to Maccabi Herzliya there he only played one season after the team faced relegation.

In June 2008 Menashe signed a 1-year deal with Maccabi Netanya, this was the first time he was a part of a top club in Israel and so far his time in Netanya is proving to be his finest. In his debut season he was the top goalscorer and also made the most assists with 8 goals and 6 assists and in his second season with the club he scored 7 goals and made 8 assists. He is considered by many fans as the MVP of Netanya in the 2008–09 season. At June 2010, Shalev signed a 3 years contract at Bnei Yehuda.

Menashe was also a part of the Israel U21 squad from 2000–2002.

His sister is Shira Ruderman.

Honours
Liga Leumit
Winner (2): 2004–05, 2013–14
Israel State Cup
Runner-up (1): 2014

References

External links
Profile at ONE

1982 births
Living people
Israeli footballers
Footballers from Rishon LeZion
Hapoel Rishon LeZion F.C. players
Maccabi Petah Tikva F.C. players
Hapoel Kfar Saba F.C. players
Maccabi Herzliya F.C. players
Maccabi Netanya F.C. players
Bnei Yehuda Tel Aviv F.C. players
Israeli Premier League players
Liga Leumit players
Association football midfielders